ArcView GIS was a geographic information system software product produced by ESRI. It was replaced by new product line, ArcGIS, in 2000. Regardless of it being discontinued and replaced, some users still find the software useful and hold the opinion it is a superior product for some tasks.

History
ArcView started as a graphical program for spatial data and maps made using ESRI's other software products. In subsequent versions, more functionality was added to ArcView and it became a true GIS program capable of complex analysis and data management. The simple GUI was preferred by many over the less user friendly, more powerful ARC/INFO that was primarily used from a Command-line interface.

ArcView 1.0
ArcView 1.0 was released in 1991  to provide access to GIS for non-traditional users of the technology. ESRI's flagship professional GIS at the time, Arc/INFO, was based on a command line interface and was not accessible to users that only needed view and query capability. The release did not support Shapefiles at the time.

ArcView 2.x
ArcView 1 was very popular, and ESRI promised a more functional 2.x version of the product. This product was developed using a multi-platform windowing environment called Neuron Data, which allowed the product to be supported on the increasingly popular Windows 95 and Windows 2000, UNIX, and Mac OS 9 platforms. This product, when finally released (18 months after its initial release date) was very successful for ESRI and brought GIS technology to many people who had not used it before.  Unfortunately, users found this version to be extremely unstable, frequently crashing with loss of all work in progress.

ArcView GIS 3.x

ArcView 3.x included even more full-featured GIS functionality, including a geoprocessing wizard and full support of extensions for raster and 3d processing. It was eventually renamed "ArcView GIS" by ESRI.

In 1997, ESRI released its final version supporting Mac OS 9 (3.0a). It is still available, although it only runs on older (PowerPC-based) Mac systems, under Mac OS 9.

The last release of ArcView GIS was version 3.3 (May 22, 2002), and was offered for both Unix and Windows variants.

Windows 7 & 8 installation instructions
It can be copied from an existing installation on a Windows XP machine to Vista, Windows 7 and 8 (search Esri Forums for Instructions).

You can also install it normally using the InstallShield 3 Setup Engine (Is3Engine.zip). The Setup Launcher for ArcView is a 16-bit application and not supported by 64 bit systems. However the InstallShield Engine is 32-bit and will run on a 64 bit system. Using the Is3Engine(File Name: setup32.exe) with its compatibility set to Windows XP SP3, Placed in a WRITABLE folder with the rest of your application install files and run instead of the original setup file (File Name: setup.exe) will allow the software to be installed on a Windows 7 or 8 64 bit system in the normal way. To have the ArcView Help files work you will need download and install WinHlp32.exe from Microsoft.

Reasons Some Users Prefer ArcView 3.x
Many GIS professionals and users still use ArcView 3 even though it has been discontinued and replaced by a new product line. Some users with access to ArcGIS 9.x or 10.x may still install and use ArcView 3.x.

ArcView 3.x offers various advantages over ArcGIS including faster start up, faster functions such as dissolve, spatial joins and summary functions executed on the tabular data. Some users also strongly prefer having the ability to promote selected records in the tables instead of simply hiding un-selected records as ArcGIS offers.  Small scale overlays and spatial joins with basic map/layout creation that tends to be the only tasks done by students are done quicker. Independent consultants, small businesses and organizations may not be able to justify the expense of moving to ArcGIS and the need to maintain annual licenses. Availability of free open source scripts and extensions created by users using the built-in object oriented scripting language Avenue is another reason.

See also
 ArcInfo
 Shapefile
 ArcView

References

External links
 Basic tutorial for ArcView 3.x on Pennsylvania Spatial Data Access
 Introduction to ArcView GIS 3.x

Esri software